Events in the year 1679 in Norway.

Incumbents
Monarch: Christian V

Events
16 March – The institution Chancellor of Norway is abolished, ending a tradition that had lasted for 400 years.
August – The mining town of Røros was destroyed by Swedish troops.
26 September – The Peace of Lund ends the Gyldenløve War.
December – Anne Løset was tried for alleged sorcery, convicted and executed by burning at Rovde.

Arts and literature

Births

Full date unknown

Deaths
16 March – Johan Frederik von Marschalck, the last Chancellor of Norway (born 1618).
December – Anne Løset, alleged witch.
Christen Bentsen Schaaning,  clergyman. (born c. 1611).

See also

References